Koovappally is a small village under Kanjirappally Taluk in the Kottayam district of Kerala, India. It is best known for its rubber industry. There are four educational institutions including one engineering college. Koovappally postal code is 686518.The nearest town is Kanjirappally. The villagers of the town are predominantly Christian, Hindu and Muslim. One of the landmark is Amal Jyothi College of Engineering   Kanjirappally.

History
Koovappally, was largely an uninhabited region at the start of the 20th century, and covered by thick forests. The agrarian expansion of the early 1900s brought many Syrian Catholic Christian families from Kanjirapally town and the nearby regions, who colonized the areas in and around Koovappally. They set up farmlands of coconut, paddy and spices, which were later turned into rubber plantations. More people - Hindus, Muslims and Christians migrated to the area, whose livelihoods were directly and indirectly linked with agriculture. The Cathedral Church at Kanjirapally owns hundreds of acres of rubber plantation around Koovappally, including the 'Koovappally Kurissumala'.

Churches

 St. Joseph's Church, Koovappally

 St. Joseph's CMS Anglican Church, Pallyppadi, Koovappally

 Fathima Matha Church, Karikulam

Temple 
Njarkalakkavu Sreedhrama Sastha Temple, Koovappally

Educational institutions 
St. Joseph U.P School
St. Joseph High School
Govt Technical High School
Assumption High School Palampra
Amal Jyothi College of Engineering

Business Around Koovappally 
Season Rubbers Pvt. Ltd.

Royal Latex Pvt. Ltd.

St. Marys Rubbers Pvt. Ltd.

Nanobird Technologies Pvt. Ltd.

References

Villages in Kottayam district